Barry Wayne Darrow (born June 27, 1950) is a former American football offensive tackle in the National Football League. He was drafted by the San Diego Chargers in the 17th round of the 1973 NFL Draft. He played college football at the University of Montana.

References

1950 births
Living people
American football offensive tackles
Montana Grizzlies football players
University of Montana alumni
Cleveland Browns players
Players of American football from Illinois